Hajji Amir Khan Sabri was elected to represent Khost Province in Afghanistan's Wolesi Jirga, the lower house of its National Legislature, in 2005.
A report on Khost prepared at the Navy Postgraduate School stated 
that he was a member of the Pashtun ethnic group.
It stated he had a ninth grade education.
It stated he was "associated with Hezbi Islami.
It stated he sat on the Legislatures Communications Committee.

References

Politicians of Khost Province
Living people
Members of the House of the People (Afghanistan)
Hezbi Islami politicians
Year of birth missing (living people)